WALL·E (Original Motion Picture Soundtrack) is the soundtrack album to the 2008 Disney-Pixar film of the same name composed and conducted by Thomas Newman. WALL·E is the second Pixar film to be scored by Thomas Newman after Finding Nemo (2003). It was also the second Pixar film not to be scored by Randy Newman or Michael Giacchino. Released by Walt Disney Records on June 24, 2008, it was mainly composed by Thomas Newman and orchestration is credited to Carl Johnson, JAC Redford, Thomas Pasatieri, and Gary K. Thomas. Newman previously scored Finding Nemo and most of all other Pixar films have been scored by either Newman's cousin Randy, Michael Giacchino or Patrick Doyle.

The soundtrack features excerpts from "Put on Your Sunday Clothes" and "It Only Takes a Moment" (both sung by Michael Crawford) from the soundtrack to the film Hello, Dolly! as well as an original song, "Down to Earth" by Peter Gabriel. Also featured in the film but not in the soundtrack are the classical pieces "Also sprach Zarathustra" and "The Blue Danube", both of which are famous for their appearances in 2001: A Space Odyssey (which was one of the big influences of the movie). Neither Etta James's cover of the song "At Last" nor "Aquarela do Brasil", both of which were used in the theatrical trailers, appeared on the final cut of the film or on the soundtrack.

Track listing
All music/tracks are composed and performed by Thomas Newman, except where noted.

Album credits
Original score composed and conducted by Thomas Newman
Produced by Thomas Newman and Bill Bernstein
Recorded and mixed by Tommy Vicari at The Village and Paramount Pictures Scoring Stage M
Orchestra recorded by Armin Steiner at Sony Pictures Scoring Stage and Newman Scoring Stage-Twentieth Century Fox Studios
Assistant engineers: Greg Hayes, Chris Owens, Shin Miyazawa, Adam Michalak, and Tim Lauber
Orchestrations by Thomas Pasatieri, J. A. C. Redford
Additional orchestrations by Gary K. Thomas and Carl Johnson
Music editor: Bill Bernstein
Digital audio: Larry Mah
Music contractor: Leslie Morris
Vocal contractor: Bobbi Page
Music preparation: Julian Bratolyubov
Assistant music editor: Mike Zainer
Audio coordination: George Doering
Digital coordination: Ernest Lee
Sound effects and voice design: Ben Burtt
Album mastered by Bernie Grundman at Bernie Grundman Mastering
Executive music producer: Chris Montan
Music supervisor: Tom MacDougall
Music production manager: Andrew Page
Music business affairs: Donna Cole-Brulé
Music production coordinator: Ashley Chafin
Music production assistants: Jill Iverson and Siobhan Sullivan
Post-production supervisor: Paul Cichocki

Awards and nominations
The soundtrack won two Grammy Awards: Best Song Written for Motion Picture, Television or Other Visual Media for "Down to Earth" and Best Instrumental Arrangement for "Define Dancing". It was also nominated for Best Score Soundtrack Album for Motion Picture, Television or Other Visual Media. In addition, the soundtrack was nominated for two Academy Awards: Best Original Score and Best Original Song for "Down to Earth".

References

Soundtrack
Pixar soundtracks
2008 soundtrack albums
2000s film soundtrack albums
Walt Disney Records soundtracks